Jingzhuang Town is a town in the Yanqing District of Beijing. It borders Shenjiaying Town in the north, Yongning Town and Dazhuangke Township in the east, Shisanling and Nankou Towns in the south, as well as Badaling and Dayushu Towns in the west. According to the 2020 census, population for this town was 9,500.

The town is named after Jingjiazhuang Village, the seat of the town's government.

Geography 
The town borders Guishui River in the north and parts of Yan Mountain Range in the other directions. Datong–Qinhuangdao railway and National Highway 110 both pass through the town.

History

Administrative divisions 
As of 2021, Jingzhuang Town had direct jurisdiction over 32 subdivisions, of which 1 was a community and the others were villages. They are listed below:

See also 

 List of township-level divisions of Beijing

References

Yanqing District
Towns in Beijing